This is a list of aircraft engines used by the Imperial Japanese Army Air Force.

Foreign aircraft engines 
Engines acquired before the conflict, provided from Axis allies, or captured during the war.

 ADC Cirrus Hermes IV (130 hp)
 Allison V-1710-39 (1,150 hp)
 Argus As 10C (240 hp)
 Argus As 109-014 (300 kg thrust)
 Armstrong Siddeley Jaguar IVC (400 hp)
 BMW VI (750 hp)
 BMW IX (500-800 hp)
 BMW 132E (660 hp)
 BMW 132K (900 hp)
 BMW 801D-2 (1,700 hp)
 BMW 801E (1,900 hp)
 BMW 109-003E-1 (800 kg thrust)
 BMW 109-003E-2 (800 kg thrust)
 Bramo 323R-2 Fafnir (1,200 hp)
 Bristol Jupiter VI (390 hp)
 Bristol Jupiter VII (500 hp)
 Bristol Mercury VIS2 (640 hp)
 Daimler-Benz DB 600G (960 hp)
 Daimler-Benz DB601 Modified Water Cooled Engine (1,550 hp)
 Daimler-Benz DB 601Aa (1,175 hp)
 Daimler Benz DB 601F (1,350 hp)
 Fiat A.80 R.C.41 (1,000 hp)
 Hirth HM 504A-2 (105 hp)
 Hirth HM 508H (240 hp)
 Hispano-Suiza 12Xcrs (690 hp)
 Junkers Jumo 205C-4 (660 hp)
 Junkers Jumo 210C (600 hp)
 Junkers Jumo 210Ca (640 hp)
 Junkers Jumo 210G (700 hp)
 Junkers Jumo 210Ea (680 hp)
 Junkers L5 (280 hp)
 Klimov M-103 (960 hp)
 Klimov M-105PF (1,210 hp)
 Lorraine-Dietrich 12Eb (450 hp)
 Lorraine 12Hfrs Petrel (780 hp)
 Lorraine 12Hgrs Petrel (780 hp)
 Menasco L-365-1 (125 hp)
 Pratt & Whitney R-1690-C (600 hp)
 Pratt & Whitney R-1830-92 (1,200 hp)
 Pratt & Whitney R-2800-10 of (2,000 hp)
 Rolls-Royce Kestrel V (608 hp)
 Shvetsov M-25V (750 hp)
 Shvetsov M-62 (1,000 hp)
 Shvetsov M-62R (1,000 hp)
 Wright SGR-1820-F52 (760 hp)
 Wright R-1820-102 (900 hp)
 Wright R-1820-G2 Cyclone (850 hp)
 Wright R-1820-G3B (900 hp)
 Wright R-1820 Cyclone 9 (1,200 hp)
 Wright R-1820-40 (1,200 hp)
 Wright R-1820-44 (1,000 hp)
 Wright SGR-1820-F52 (760 hp)
 Wright R-3350-23 Cyclone 18 (2,000 hp)

Japanese aero-engine designations

See also 
 Japanese aircraft engine identification systems
 List of aircraft engines
 List of Aircraft engines used by Japanese Navy Air Service

References

Engines
Lists of aircraft engines